The Soviet Union women's national basketball team was the women's basketball side that represented the Soviet Union in international competitions. After the dissolution of the Soviet Union in 1991, the successor countries all set up their own national teams.

Competition record

See also
Soviet Union women's national under-19 basketball team
Soviet Union women's national under-17 basketball team
Russia women's national basketball team

References

External links
All-time record

National team
Women's basketball in the Soviet Union
Women's national basketball teams
Former national basketball teams
W